Now Is the Time is an album by trumpeter Idrees Sulieman recorded in 1976 and released on the SteepleChase label.

Reception

Allmusic rated the album 4 stars.

Track listing 
All compositions by Idrees Sulieman except as indicated
 "Mirror Lake"7:27
 "Misty Thursday" (Duke Jordan)4:26
 "Saturday Afternoon at Four"5:10
 "A Theme for Ahmad" (Horace Parlan)4:54
 "Now's the Time" (Charlie Parker)7:35
 "The Best I Could Dream"4:29
 "Carefree"7:58
 "The Best I Could Dream" [Alternate Take 3]5:29 Bonus track on CD reissue

Personnel 
Idrees Suliemantrumpet, flugelhorn
Cedar Waltonpiano
Sam Jonesbass
Billy Higginsdrums

References 

Idrees Sulieman albums
1976 albums
SteepleChase Records albums